Stolsvatnet is a regulated lake in the municipalities of Ål and Hol in Viken county, Norway. Stolsvatnet was formed in the late 1940s by the damming of the upper parts of three rivers, (Stolsvatn, Olsendvatn, Holselva) which created a continuous lake across the watersheds. The new lake covered a number of existing smaller lakes. It is a reservoir for Hol I kraftverk,  a hydroelectric power plant located off FV 50 by Hovet in Hol. The power plant is owned and operated by E-Co Energi.

See also
Strandavatnet

References

External links
E-Co Energi

Lakes of Viken (county)